The Definitive Singles Collection 1984–2004 is a greatest hits album by Norwegian band A-ha, released on 11 April 2005.

Despite the title, the album contains tracks from 1985 to 2004, though the original version of "Take On Me" was released in 1984. The album contains 17 of their hits plus an enhanced video for the song "Take On Me". The track listing of this album is slightly different from that of The Singles: 1984–2004. It marked the return of A-ha to the top 20 of the UK Albums Chart, where it peaked at number 14. The album re-entered the chart at number 99 in 2015.

Comparison 
The Definitive Singles Collection 1984–2004 has fewer unique singles (17, as "Take On Me" appears twice) than The Singles: 1984–2004 (19).

The Definitive Singles Collection 1984–2004 lacks the following songs, which exist on "The Singles: 1984–2004":

"Move to Memphis"
"Minor Earth, Major Sky"
"Forever Not Yours"

The album, however, adds the single "You Are the One", which did not feature on The Singles: 1984-2004. This album was the last by the group to be released by Warner Bros. In 2010, the album was released in the US.

Track listing

The Singles: 1984–2004

The Definitive Singles Collection 1984–2004
 "Take On Me"
 "The Sun Always Shines on T.V."
 "Train of Thought"
 "Hunting High and Low"
 "I've Been Losing You"
 "Cry Wolf"
 "Manhattan Skyline"
 "The Living Daylights"
 "Stay on These Roads"
 "Touchy!"
 "You Are the One (Album Version)"
 "Crying in the Rain"
 "Dark is the Night"
 "Shapes That Go Together"
 "Summer Moved On"
 "Lifelines"
 "Velvet"
 "Take On Me" (enhanced video)

Charts

Certifications

References

External links
 

2005 greatest hits albums
A-ha albums
Warner Records compilation albums